Avondale is a census-designated place (CDP) and post office in and governed by Pueblo County, Colorado, United States. The CDP is a part of the Pueblo, CO Metropolitan Statistical Area. The Avondale post office has the ZIP Code 81022. At the United States Census 2020, the population of the Avondale CDP was 594, while the population of the 81022 ZIP Code Tabulation Area was 1,624 including adjacent areas.

History
The Avondale post office has been in operation since 1892. The name Avondale is derived from Stratford-upon-Avon.

Geography

Demographics

See also

 List of census-designated places in Colorado

References

External links

 Avondale @ UncoverColorado.com
 Pueblo County website

Census-designated places in Pueblo County, Colorado
Census-designated places in Colorado
Colorado populated places on the Arkansas River